Major League Futsal USA was the first professional futsal league in the United States. It was founded in 2012 by Rosario Lopez.

History
MLF has two divisions (Division of Honor and Division 1) for both men and women. While 35 men's teams and 9 women's teams were listed by the company, 14 of these men's teams and 7 of women's did not play in the 2017 season.

The first exhibition season was played in 2015. A full season was contested in 2016 with a national tournament to conclude the season in August. Safira FC defeated KnowEns Futsal 5-1 in the final to claim the first league title.

Season two saw Detroit-based Waza Flo defeat Portland United in the championship.

Teams

Champions

References

External links 
 

Futsal leagues in the United States
Sports leagues established in 2015
2015 establishments in the United States
Professional sports leagues in the United States